This is a timeline of Chiang Kai-shek's (Jiang Jieshi) life.

1880s

1890s

1900s

1910s

1920s

1930s

1940s

1970s

See also
 History of China–United States relations to 1948

Citations

References

Chiang Kai-shek
Warlord Era
Military history of the Republic of China (1912–1949)